is a Japanese manga artist and writer, best known for her manga series A Silent Voice and To Your Eternity.

Life 
Ōima was born on March 15, 1989, in Ōgaki, Japan as the third daughter of a sign language interpreter mother and has an older sister and an older brother. Due to her mother's work as a sign language interpreter Ōima was inspired to write the A Silent Voice manga series where she got help by her mother and her sister working on the series.

Her first manga was Mardock Scramble which was an adaptation of the same-named novel written by Tow Ubukata and was released in 2009. She was also responsible for an illustration of the ending sequence of the ninth episode of Attack on Titan. After her success with A Silent Voice Yoshitoki Ōima worked alongside other manga artists on a collaboration manga called Ore no 100-wame!!. In 2016 Yoshitoki Ōima released her third full manga series under the moniker To Your Eternity.

In 2015 , Yoshitoki Ōima won the New Creator Prize for A Silent Voice at the Tezuka Osamu Cultural Prize. A Silent Voice was nominated for an Eisner Award a year later, the Rudolf-Dirks-Award and the Max & Moritz Prize in 2017 and 2018. In 2018 she won at French Japan Expo the Daruma d′Or Manga for A Silent Voice and the Daruma de la Meilleure Nouvelle Série for To Your Eternity.

Works 
 Mardock Scramble (2009-2012, Serialized in Bessatsu Shonen Magazine)
 A Silent Voice (2013-2014, Serialized in Weekly Shonen Magazine)
 Ore no 100-wame!! (alongside other manga artists) (2015)
 To Your Eternity (2016-Ongoing, Serialized in Weekly Shonen Magazine)

Accolades 
 Tezuka Osamu Cultural Prize
 2015: New Creator Prize for A Silent Voice (won)
 Manga Taishō
 2015: Manga for A Silent Voice (nominated)
 2018: Manga for To Your Eternity (nominated)
 Eisner Awards
 2016: Best U.S. Edition of International Material—Asia for A Silent Voice (nominated)
 Rudolf-Dirks-Awards
 2017: Best Scenario (Asia) for A Silent Voice (won)
 Max & Moritz Prize
 2018: for A Silent Voice (nominated)
 Japan Expo
 2018: Daruma d′Or Manga for A Silent Voice (won)
 2018: Daruma de la Meilleure Nouvelle Série for To Your Eternity (won)

Notes

External links 
 Yoshitoki Ōima in the Anime News Network encyclopaedia
 Yoshitoki Ōima at AniSearch 
 Interview in Le Monde 

1989 births
Living people
Manga artists from Gifu Prefecture
Winner of Tezuka Osamu Cultural Prize (New Artist Prize)
Women manga artists